Sadat Rahman is a Bangladeshi social entrepreneur. He won the International Children's Peace Prize in 2020 for making an anti-cyberbullying mobile app named Cyber Teens. He is the goodwill ambassador of Casio.

Career 
Sadat Rahman works to educate teenagers of Bangladesh about cyberbullying. Teenagers can report all types of cyberbullying to his app Cyber Teens. Since its inception in 2019, his app has led to the arrest of eight cybercriminals and helped many teenagers.

Rahman became the goodwill ambassador of Casio in February 2022.

References

External links 
 Cyber Teens website

2003 births
Living people
Youth activists
People from Magura District